SC Hessen Dreieich is a German association football club from the town of Dreieich, Hesse. The club's greatest success has been promotion to the fourth tier in 2018.

History
SC Hessen Dreieich was formed on 20 June 2013 to consolidate the local football clubs in the region after cuts in the community budged reduced the support for these by 20 percent. The new club had the support of Hans Nolte, owner of Hahn Air, who invested €2.5 million in a new stadium for the club. The new club took up the league place of the SKG Sprendlingen which had won promotion from the tier seven Gruppenliga to the Verbandsliga Hessen-Süd at the end of the 2012–13 season. A number of local clubs initially complained about the new club, coached by former Bundesliga player Thomas Epp, claiming it was poaching youth and senior players from them.

The new club finished ninth in the Verbandsliga in its first season and won the league the year after. Through this the club won promotion to the tier five Hessenliga for 2015–16. With Zubayr Amiri and Khaibar Amani the club had two players from the Afghanistan national football team in their squad in 2015–16.

On 15 March 2020, the club announced that it would initially withdraw its first team from competition with the end of the 2019–20 Hessenliga season. This decision was motivated by a desire to focus the club's activities and financial resources more towards its youth teams. Hessen Dreieich's spot in the league was to be filled by the newly founded International Soccer Club Rhein-Main (ISCRM). However, because of the coronavirus disease pandemic in Germany, the Hessian Football Association froze ISCRM's application to join the Hessenliga on 27 April and Dreieich had to continue participating in the league for 2020–21.

Players

Current squad

Honours
The club's honours:
 Hessenliga
 Champions: 2016–17, 2017–18
 Verbandsliga Hessen-Süd
 Champions: 2013–14

Seasons
The season-by-season performance of the club:

References

External links
Official team site 
SC Hessen Dreieich at Weltfussball.de 

Football clubs in Germany
Football clubs in Hesse
Association football clubs established in 2013
2013 establishments in Germany